Methoxyethylmercuric acetate is a chemical compound formerly used as a pesticide for seeds of cotton and small grains. It is highly toxic, and can pose a threat to the brain and central nervous system.

References

Mercury(II) compounds
Pesticides
Acetates
Organomercury compounds